Rachel M. Weston (born 1981) is a former Vermont State Representative for the Chittenden-3-3 District representing Old North End, Downtown, and Waterfront in Burlington, Vermont. First elected in 2006, Weston stepped down from the legislature in 2012 to take a job working on women's political participation in the Middle East.

Early life and career
She graduated from the University of Massachusetts Amherst in 2003 (BA, Anthropology) and the University of Vermont in 2006 (MPA,  Public Administration). Prior to pursuing a Masters, she was a public school teacher and worked with community non-profit organizations. She served as President of the UVM Graduate Student Senate, and as a Campus Compact Civic Engagement Fellow. She was elected to serve in the 2007–2008, 2009–2010, and 2011-2012 legislatures.  Weston was the youngest serving member of the Vermont State Legislature. She served as a member of the House Ways and Means Committee and the Natural Resources and Energy Committee.

References

External links
 Campaign site

Living people
Politicians from Burlington, Vermont
1981 births
Members of the Vermont House of Representatives
Women state legislators in Vermont
University of Massachusetts Amherst College of Social and Behavioral Sciences alumni
21st-century American women